Ben & Sam is a 2010 Filipino indie film, directed by Mark Shandii Bacolod and starring Ray An Dulay, Jess Mendoza, Micah Muñoz, Ana Abad Santos and Tara Cabaero. The film is about two campus kings who are in love. The film, which premiered at the 2010 Queer Love Film Festival on February 17, 2010, was written by Archie Del Mundo.

Plot
Ben is haunted by painful memories of his abusive father, and is suffering even more at present due to his increasingly eccentric mother. He is eventually toughened by this condition. Sam, meanwhile, is still grieving the murder of his activist boyfriend. Both boys turn to recreational activities to forget their painful precedents; Ben becomes involved in basketball, while Sam takes up dancing.

Although Ben is surrounded by friends, he is unhappy, until a deep emotional connection and mutual admiration brings Ben and Sam together. Although Ben is confused, Sam is persistent and sincere, and their liaison eventually blossoms into something deeper.

Cast
 Ray An Dulay as Ben
 Jess Mendoza as Sam
 Micah Muñoz as George
 Ana Abad Santos as Arlene
 Tara Cabaero as Sugar
 Simon Ibarra as Mr. Quirino
 Malouh Crisologo as Dean
 Angeli Bayani as Prof Castro
 Jerri Barrios as Coach Mario

Special screening
The film was featured at the 2010 Cinemalaya Independent Film Festival  as part of the July midnight shows.

References

External links
 

2010 films
Philippine drama films
2010s Tagalog-language films